Sang Bon is a village in Pain Taleqan Rural District, in the Central District of Taleqan County, Alborz province, Iran. At the 2006 census, its population was 421 in 92 households. At the latest census in 2016, its population was 442 in 199 households; it is the largest village in its rural district.

References 

Taleqan County

Populated places in Alborz Province

Populated places in Taleqan County